Jakes Run may refer to:

Jakes Run (Little Muncy Creek), a stream in Pennsylvania
Jakes Run (Dunkard Creek), a stream in West Virginia
Jakes Run, West Virginia, an unincorporated community